Larry Gonick (born 1946) is a cartoonist best known for The Cartoon History of the Universe, a history of the world in comic book form, which he published in installments from 1977 to 2009.  He has also written The Cartoon History of the United States, and he has adapted the format for a series of co-written guidebooks on other subjects, beginning with The Cartoon Guide to Genetics in 1983.  The diversity of his interests, and the success with which his books have met, have together earned Gonick the distinction of being "the most well-known and respected of cartoonists who have applied their craft to unravelling the mysteries of science".

Early life 
Gonick was born in 1946, in San Francisco, California. He studied mathematics at Harvard University, receiving his bachelor's degree in 1967 and his master's degree in 1969.

Comic strips and cartoons
From 1990 to 1997, Gonick penned a bimonthly "Science Classics" cartoon for the science magazine Discover. Each two-page comic discussed a recent scientific development, often one in interdisciplinary research.

During the 1994-95 academic year, Gonick was a Knight Science Journalism Fellow at MIT.

In 1997, his 14-issue series, Candide in China, published on the World Wide Web, described Chinese inventions.

He also used to write the Kokopelli & Company comic that appeared in the magazine Muse.

He drew the satirical, anti-corporate comic Commoners for Common Ground and later explained: 
Feeling alternately mournful and enraged about the shameless expropriation of public space, public enterprise, publicly held goods like the atmosphere, oceans, and rivers, not to mention roads, parks, sidewalks, genomes, and the broadcast spectrum—indeed the very idea of the common good—I decided to do something about it! Well, say something, anyway.

Between 2009 and 2011 Gonick drew a humorous webcomic entitled Raw Materials that deals with technology and business matters, especially database administration.

In collaboration with Dr. Kausik S Das of the University of Maryland Eastern Shore Gonick is currently developing concept-cartoon clicker questions for undergraduate physics students. This project is funded by the National Science Foundation.

Awards
In 1999, Gonick was awarded the Inkpot Award.

Bibliography
 Blood from a Stone: A Cartoon Guide to Tax Reform (with Steve Atlas), (1972 (?), New York Public Interest Research Group)
 The Cartoon Guide to Computer Science (1983, Barnes & Noble; 1991 reprinted as The Cartoon Guide to the Computer, Collins)
 The Cartoon Guide to Genetics (with Mark Wheelis) (1983, Barnes & Noble; 1991 revised edition, Collins)
 The Cartoon Guide to U.S. History: 1865-Now (1987, Barnes & Noble; 1991 revised edition as The Cartoon History of the United States, Collins)
 Neo-Babelonia: A serious study in contemporary confusion (1989, Veen/BSO)
 The Cartoon History of the Universe - From the Big Bang to Alexander the Great (Volumes 1-7) (1990, Doubleday)
 The Cartoon Guide to Physics (with Art Huffman) (1991, Harper Perennial; 1992 reprint edition, Collins)
 The Cartoon Guide to (non)Communication (1993 reprint edition, Collins)
 The Cartoon Guide to Statistics (with Woollcott Smith) (1994, Collins)
 The Cartoon History of the Universe II - From the Springtime of China to the Fall of Rome (Volumes 8-13) (1994, Doubleday)
 The Cartoon Guide to the Environment (with Alice Outwater) (1996, Collins)
 The Cartoon Guide to Sex (with Christine Devault) (1999, Collins)
 The Cartoon History of the Universe III - From the Rise of Arabia to the Renaissance (Volumes 14-19) (2002, Doubleday)
 Kokopelli and Company in Attack of the Smart Pies (fiction) (2005, Cricket Books)
 The Cartoon Guide to Chemistry (with Craig Criddle) (2005, Collins)
 The Cartoon History of the Modern World, Volume 1: From Columbus to the U.S. Constitution (2007, Collins)
 The Cartoon History of the Modern World, Volume 2: From the Bastille to Baghdad (2009, Collins)
 The Cartoon Guide to Calculus (2011, William Morrow Paperbacks)
 The Cartoon Guide to Algebra (2015, William Morrow Paperbacks)
 Hypercapitalism: The Modern Economy, Its Values, and How to Change Them (2018, The New Press)
 The Cartoon Guide to Biology (2019, William Morrow Paperbacks)

References

External links
 Larry Gonick official site
 Cartoon Larry Gonick | Curriculum Vitae
 Candide in China
 Discover mathematical strips
 

1946 births
21st-century American historians
American male non-fiction writers
American cartoonists
American comics artists
American comics writers
American skeptics
Harvard College alumni
Living people
Harvard Graduate School of Arts and Sciences alumni
Writers from San Francisco
Inkpot Award winners
Artists from San Francisco
Historians from California
21st-century American male writers
Discover (magazine) people